Terence Oldfield (born 12 August 1949) is an English composer, and brother to Sally and Mike Oldfield.

History

Early life
Born in Palmers Green, North London, Oldfield and his siblings were raised in the Roman Catholic faith of their mother, Maureen. Oldfield spent his childhood partly in Dublin and partly in Reading, Berkshire. He later attended Douai School a Benedictine monastery school and also spent a few terms at the Oratory School in Woodcote, Oxfordshire. His earliest musical experiences were in the myriad of folk clubs that sprang up in the UK during the late 1960s and early 1970s, listening to the songs of Leonard Cohen, Bert Jansch, John Renbourn and Bob Dylan.

Oldfield left school at 16 to travel the world and worked as a roadie for various bands including The Byrds. During an extended stay on the Greek island of Hydra, he took up his first musical instrument, the flute. "I think it was learning to play in this way, with no formal guidance, that allowed me to develop the ability to compose music. I spent many happy days improvising tunes and discovering scales and arpeggios for myself, and soon started to teach myself to write these things down". Terry's only formal music training was in Agra, India, where he spent some time learning to play the tabla.

In the early 1970s, Terry and his brother Mike formed a band called 'Barefoot' (or 'Barefeet') playing rock'n'roll at colleges and clubs throughout the UK. Mike later went on to record the highly successful Tubular Bells and Terry played the flute in the live performance at the Queen Elizabeth Hall, June 25, 1973, London.

Terry also appears on Mike's albums Hergest Ridge (woodwind – uncredited), Ommadawn (pan-pipes) and extensively on Incantations (flute).

Solo career
Terry, his brother Mike and his sister Sally all completed the Exegesis Programme Large Group Awareness Training course. Terry recorded a piece of flute music which was used to accompany the last section of the course.

Oldfield's career began in earnest when he was asked by the BBC to compose music for a series called Great Railway Journeys of the World. Since then Oldfield has composed music for over 50 film and TV productions, receiving two Emmy nominations for Land of the Tiger and Twilight of the Dreamtime and a BAFTA nomination for the BBC series Kingdom of the Ice Bear. He also worked on Meerkats United, which in a National Television Poll was voted 'Best Wildlife Film Ever'.

Oldfield had a relationship with New World Music, one of the world's leading 'World' music labels, for over 10 years and has a back catalogue of over 15 recordings. In 2001, Oldfield signed a multi-record contract with New Earth Records in Santa Fe, New Mexico. His work contains a wide range of ideas and influences and has sold over one million units worldwide.

In 2001, Oldfield moved to Australia.

Discography

Albums

 Sunshine Holidays – 1983
 In Search of the Trojan War – 1985
 Cascade – 1986
 Reverence – 1986
 Return to Treasure Island – 1987
 In the Presence of Light – 1987
 Resonance – 1988
 Star of Heaven – 1989
 Spirit of the Rainforest – 1990
 Angel – 1990
 Zen – 1991
 Illumination – 1992
 Spiral Waves – 1992
 Out of the Depths – 1993
 Spirit of Africa – 1993
 Australia – 1994
 Spirit of Tibet – 1994
 Earth Spirit – 1995
 Icon – 1995
 Theme for the Telford Time Machine – 1996
 Spirit of India – 1996
 South East Asia – 1997
 All The Rivers Gold – 1999
 Music for Wildlife – 2000
 Reflections – The Best of Terry Oldfield 1985–1995 – 2000
 Across the Universe – 2000
 Spirit of the World – 2000
 Turning Point 2002
 A Time for Peace – 2003
 Yoga Harmony – 2004
 Celt – 2004
 De Profundis / Out of the Depths II – 2005
 Ethereal – 2005
 Reiki Harmony – 2006
 Om (with Medwyn Goodall) - 2007
 Labyrinth – 2007
 Mandala: Circle of Chant - 2008
 Yoga Nidra (with Soraya Saraswati) – 2009
 Silent Night, Peaceful Night - 2010
 Healing Sound Journey (with Soraya Saraswati) – 2011
 Journey into Space (with Mike Oldfield) – 2012
 Peaceful Hearts (with Soraya Saraswati) – 2013
 Namaste (with Soraya Saraswati) – 2016
 Sky Dancer (with Carlos Garo)'' – 2017
Temple Moon (with Soraya Saraswati ) - 2017
On Fire - 2018
Rhapsody - 2018
Soundscapes For Awakening - 2018
Forever One (with Soraya Saraswati ) - 2019
Healing Hands Subliminal Music For Massage - 2019
Music For Relaxation - 2019

References

External links
 
 New Earth Records
 Ultimate Music Database

1949 births
Living people
English composers
People from Palmers Green
People from Reading, Berkshire
English expatriates in Australia